Baudino is a surname. Notable people with the surname include:

Gael Baudino (born 1955), American fantasy author
Lucrezia Baudino (born 2001), Italian rower
Stefano Baudino (born 1963), Italian cyclist

See also
Gaudino